The following is the qualification system and list of qualified nations for the table tennis at the 2019 Pan American Games competition.

Qualification system
A total of 84 athletes will qualify to compete (42 men and 42 women). Each nation may enter a maximum of 6 athletes (three per gender). In each gender there will be a total of 12 teams qualified, with one team per event reserved for the host nation Peru. Six places will be allocated for singles events (by gender) to athletes that have obtained the best results at the qualification tournament for singles events of the Pan American Games. Athletes qualified through various qualifying events.

The top six teams (for men and women) at the 2018 Pan American Championships, the top placed team from the Caribbean, Central America, South America and North America (not already qualified), and the top team not qualified as of the May 2019 world rankings each qualified a team. As stated earlier, Peru also qualified a team in each event. The last 6 spots were awarded to individuals, with a maximum of two per nation.

Qualification timeline

Qualification summary

Men

Women

No North American selection occurred, as both Canada and the USA already qualified.

References

Pan American Games Qualification
Pan American Games Qualification
Qualification for the 2019 Pan American Games
Table tennis at the 2019 Pan American Games